Floris Goesinnen (born 30 October 1983 in Opperdoes) is a Dutch former professional road cyclist.

Major results

2006
 2nd Ronde van Drenthe
 5th Hel van het Mergelland
2007
 1st Nationale Sluitingsprijs
2008
 1st Stage 1 Tour de l'Ain
 1st Stage 1b (TTT) Brixia Tour
 5th Grand Prix d'Isbergues
2009
 5th Halle–Ingooigem
2010
 7th Druivenkoers-Overijse
2011
 1st Stage 4 Tour de Taiwan
 3rd Internationale Wielertrofee Jong Maar Moedig
 4th Road race, National Road Championships
 8th Overall Rás Tailteann
 9th Ocbc Cycle Classic Singapore
2012
 1st Stage 2 Flèche du Sud
 2nd Overall Tour of Taihu Lake
 8th Overall New Zealand Cycle Classic

References

1983 births
Living people
Dutch male cyclists
People from Noorder-Koggenland
Cyclists from North Holland
21st-century Dutch people